The 69th Infantry Regiment was twice a Regular Army (United States) Infantry Branch regiment that never saw combat.

The regiment was constituted 9 July 1918 in the Regular Army as the 69th Infantry and assigned to the 10th Infantry Division; Organized 10 August 1918 at Camp Funston, Kansas from personnel of the 41st Infantry. Relieved from the 10th Division and demobilized 13 February 1919 at Camp Funston.

Constituted 1 October 1933 in the Regular Army as the 69th Infantry (Light Tank) and allotted to the Seventh Corps Area. Organized about 1936 with headquarters at Minneapolis, Minnesota. Disbanded 11 November 1944.

Distinctive unit insignia
 Description: A Gold color metal and enamel device 1 1/4 inches (3.18 cm) in height overall consisting of a shield blazoned:  Azure, a wyvern erect Or.
 Symbolism: The shield is blue for Infantry.  The wyvern is a fabulous monster whose glance is death, and to whom is attributed the power to go through flames and to crush and destroy, it also symbolizes mobility.
 Background: The distinctive unit insignia was approved on 23 June 1939.  It was rescinded on 27 January 1959.

Coat of arms
Blazon
 Shield: Azure, a wyvern erect Or.
 Crest: None.
 Motto: CONJUNCTIS VIRIBUS (With United Powers).
 Symbolism
 Shield: The shield is blue for Infantry.  The wyvern is a fabulous monster whose glance is death, and to whom is attributed the power to go through flames and to crush and destroy, it also symbolizes mobility.
 Crest: None.
 Background: The coat of arms was approved on 23 June 1939.  It was rescinded on 27 January 1959.

References
 Historical register and dictionary of the United States Army, from ..., Volume 1 By Francis Bernard Heitman

External links
 "Tenth Division", angelfire.com.

Infantry regiments of the United States Army
Military units and formations established in 1918
Military units and formations disestablished in 1944